Palimnodes ducalis is a species of beetle in the family Cerambycidae, and the only species in the genus Palimnodes. It was described by Henry Walter Bates in 1884.

References

Ancylonotini
Beetles described in 1884
Monotypic beetle genera